Heaven's Burning is a 1997 Australian crime film starring Russell Crowe and directed by Craig Lahiff. The film was released in Australia on 6 November 1997. It follows the adventures of an Australian getaway driver (Crowe) and a Japanese runaway bride (Youki Kudoh) on a road trip as they are pursued by both criminals and the police. This was Russell Crowe's last Australian film until 2014's The Water Diviner.

Plot
Japanese bride Midori Takada (Youki Kudoh) arrives in Sydney with her new husband Yukio (Kenji Isomura). She believes her marriage is a mistake and uses the honeymoon as a means to escape. Colin O'Brien (Russell Crowe) is an experienced getaway driver. He is hired by an Australian-Afghan family to help rob a bank. During the robbery one member is killed. Midori is in the bank at the same time and they grab her as a hostage. After escaping, the two Afghan brothers decide to get rid of her. Colin will not allow this. He kills one of the brothers and threatens to shoot the other, Mahood (Robert Mammone). He and Midori escape.

Colin wishes to travel to see his father, Cam, at his ranch because he has not seen him in years. Midori chooses to stay with Colin. The duo rob a bank to fund their trip. Mahood and his father, Boorjan (Petru Gheorghiu), swear revenge and set out to catch Colin. The police, aware of the Afghan family's illegal activities, are also in pursuit. Yukio is told of his wife's involvement and he is aware that she left him by choice. His honor injured, he goes to find her.

Colin and Midori venture across New South Wales. The Afghans catch up with Colin and begin to torture him, but Colin manages to kill the patriarch and remaining son. Yukio searches for Midori, killing people along the way. Colin and Midori eventually reach the ranch owned by his father, Cam (Ray Barrett). The duo stays for a short while and officially become lovers. They then leave to visit the seashore.

Yukio reaches the ranch soon after and threatens Cam with death if he does not tell him where Midori has gone. Cam responds that he believes in karma and Yukio will soon pay for his evil ways. Enraged, Yukio does not simply shoot Cam; he drowns him. After some setbacks, Yukio catches up with the lovers and shoots Colin in the torso. Midori retrieves a gun from their car and shoots Yukio, who then shoots her in the side. He tells her that he still loves her, but she counters that he does not know what love is and then kills him. The police hear about the shootout and chase the lovers. Midori drives while Colin is slowly dying in the passenger's seat. They reach the shore, but their car rolls over and catches fire. She shoots herself and the car explodes. The police watch as the car burns.

Cast
Russell Crowe – Colin O'Brien
Youki Kudoh – Midori Takada
Kenji Isomura – Yukio Takada
Ray Barrett – Cam O'Brien
Robert Mammone – Mahood
Petru Gheorghiu – Boorjan
Colin Hay – Jonah (cameo)
Salvatore Coco – Gulbuddin
Gina Zoia - Bank Teller
Mark Hembrow - Truck Driver

Reception
The film earned $55,780 from its limited release in Australian theatres.

The film received mixed reviews. David Stratton from Variety gave a favourable review, calling the film "an energetic road movie that keeps careening off in unexpected directions". Movie-vault.com gave the film 5 out of 10, commenting that for an 'action/drama' film, the film had little action and did not perform well as a drama. Time Out's review stated the film took a while to take off, and had some criticism of the plot and acting, but noted the director "manages to balance the action and human interest".

DVD release
The film was released on DVD on 7 November 2000. It was presented in 2.35:1 widescreen. Reviewers complained of the amount of grain in the footage, also not impressed by marks and spots on the film. It featured Dolby Stereo 2.0 sound however the sound was criticized for being mixed in too low, and being difficult to understand at times. The DVD did receive praise for the number of extras it included.

See also
 Cinema of Australia
 Russell Crowe filmography

References

External links

Heaven's Burning review Mutant Reviewers from Hell
Heaven's Burning at Oz Movies

1990s action drama films
1990s crime action films
1997 crime drama films
1990s road movies
1997 films
Australian crime drama films
Australian films about revenge
Australian independent films
Australian road movies
Films about bank robbery
Films about hostage takings
Films about interracial romance
Films about suicide
1990s English-language films